This is a list of statistical mechanics topics, by Wikipedia page.

Physics
 Probability amplitude
 Statistical physics
 Boltzmann factor
 Feynman–Kac formula
 Fluctuation theorem
 Information entropy
 Vacuum expectation value
 Cosmic variance
 Negative probability
 Gibbs state
 Master equation
 Partition function (mathematics)
 Quantum probability

Percolation theory
 Schramm–Loewner evolution

 
Mathematics-related lists
Lists of topics